Sir John Hall Magowan,  was a British diplomat. Raised in Mountnorris, Co. Armagh, he was educated at the Royal School, Armagh and Trinity College, Dublin. He married Winifred Isabel and had a daughter, Ann Isabel Magowan, and two sons, William Andrew Magowan and David Magowan.

He served as British Ambassador to Venezuela from 1948 to 1951, and died while back in Northern Ireland on leave on 5 April 1951. He had been appointed British Ambassador to Thailand in December 1950, but died before he could present his credentials.

References 

Date of birth unknown
1951 deaths
Alumni of Trinity College Dublin
Ambassadors of the United Kingdom to Venezuela
Companions of the Order of St Michael and St George
Knights Commander of the Order of the British Empire
People educated at The Royal School, Armagh